The following highways are numbered 38:

Australia
 A38 (Sydney)

Canada
 Alberta Highway 38
 Ontario Highway 38 (former)
 Saskatchewan Highway 38

Czech Republic
 I/38 Highway; Czech: Silnice I/38

Germany
 Bundesautobahn 38

India
  National Highway 38 (India)

Iran
 Road 38

Israel
 Highway 38 (Israel)

Italy
 State road 38

Japan
 Japan National Route 38
 Dōtō Expressway

Korea, South
 National Route 38

Malaysia
 Johor Bahru Eastern Dispersal Link Expressway

New Zealand
 New Zealand State Highway 38

United Kingdom
 British A38 (Bodmin-Mansfield)

United States
 U.S. Route 38 (former)
 Alabama State Route 38
 Arkansas Highway 38
 California State Route 38
 County Route J38 (California)
 Colorado State Highway 38 (former)
 Georgia State Route 38
Hawaii Route 38 (former)
 Idaho State Highway 38
 Illinois Route 38
 Indiana State Road 38
 Iowa Highway 38
 K-38 (Kansas highway) (former)
 Kentucky Route 38
 Louisiana Highway 38
 Maryland Route 38
 Massachusetts Route 38
 M-38 (Michigan highway)
 Minnesota State Highway 38
 Missouri Route 38
 Montana Highway 38
 Nebraska Highway 38 (former)
 Nebraska Highway 38C (former)
 Nevada State Route 38 (former)
 New Hampshire Route 38
 New Jersey Route 38
 County Route 38 (Bergen County, New Jersey)
 County Route 38 (Monmouth County, New Jersey)
 County Route 38 (Ocean County, New Jersey)
 New Mexico State Road 38
 New York State Route 38
 County Route 38 (Cayuga County, New York)
 County Route 38 (Chemung County, New York)
 County Route 38 (Dutchess County, New York)
 County Route 38 (Essex County, New York)
 County Route 38 (Genesee County, New York)
 County Route 38 (Greene County, New York)
 County Route 38 (Livingston County, New York)
 County Route 38 (Madison County, New York)
 County Route 38 (Montgomery County, New York)
 County Route 38 (Orange County, New York)
 County Route 38 (Putnam County, New York)
 County Route 38 (Rensselaer County, New York)
 County Route 38 (Rockland County, New York)
 County Route 38 (St. Lawrence County, New York)
 County Route 38 (Suffolk County, New York)
 County Route 38 (Warren County, New York)
 County Route 38 (Wyoming County, New York)
 North Carolina Highway 38
 North Dakota Highway 38
 Ohio State Route 38
 Oklahoma State Highway 38
 Oregon Route 38
 Pennsylvania Route 38
 South Carolina Highway 38
 South Dakota Highway 38
 Tennessee State Route 38
 Texas State Highway 38 (former)
 Texas State Highway Loop 38 (former)
 Texas State Highway Spur 38
 Farm to Market Road 38
 Texas Park Road 38
 Utah State Route 38
 Vermont Route 38
 Virginia State Route 38
 Virginia State Route 38 (1923-1933) (former)
 West Virginia Route 38
 Wisconsin Highway 38

Territories
 Puerto Rico Highway 38
 U.S. Virgin Islands Highway 38

See also
List of highways numbered 38A
List of highways numbered 38B